Horse valuation is the process of assessing the value of a horse in the opinion of a qualified appraiser. There are also online value calculators available, which can be easy-to-use tools when used by an open and objective evaluator. Before using such tools it is important to have a complete understanding of horses and what attributes are important in evaluating horses. A horse is a unique individual and sometimes impossible to value. Horse value is usually used as a pre-qualification pricing factor related to the issuance of equine insurance or purchase.

An objective evaluation of a horse's attributes such as: conformation, disposition, training level, pedigree, intellect and temperament. The health, soundness and bad vices should be considered for overall purpose of the horse. In most cases veterinarians can perform a pre-purchase examine.  For a proper horse valuation, a horse breed, color, age, sex and location of horse are also important factors for market demand considerations.

References

http://pods.dasnr.okstate.edu/docushare/dsweb/Get/Document-2083/F-4004web.pdf
http://www.uaex.edu/Other_Areas/publications/PDF/FSA-3029.pdf

Horse management